David Jamieson may refer to:

 David Jamieson (British politician) (born 1947), West Midlands Police and Crime Commissioner and former British Member of Parliament
 David Jamieson (Canadian politician) (1856–1942), speaker of the Legislature of Ontario
 David Jamieson (VC) (1920–2001), English recipient of the Victoria Cross
 David Jamieson (rugby union), Scottish rugby player
 David Ewan Jamieson (1930–2013), Royal New Zealand Air Force officer

See also 
 David Jamison (disambiguation)
 David Jameson (disambiguation)